Newfoundland (also Crackers Neck) is an unincorporated community in Elliott County, Kentucky, United States. It lies along Routes 7 and 32 north of the city of Sandy Hook, the county seat of Elliott County. Its elevation is 643 feet (196 m).

References

Unincorporated communities in Elliott County, Kentucky
Unincorporated communities in Kentucky